Internex Online, usually known as io.org, was the first consumer dial-up ISP in Canada, formed by the merger of r-node and zooid BBS, two Bulletin board system and Usenet/uucp systems, in early 1993. At its peak, it had about 10,000 customers, and was credited for leading in low cost access.

In November 1995 Internex was bought by Greenlight Communications, and six months later Greenlight sold it, along with most of Greenlight's assets, to ACC Telenterprises, where it was quickly absorbed into their general pool of internet subscribers.

Aside from its grass-roots and hackish beginnings, Internex Online was notable for an early commitment to provide free services (free access was available during non peak times), as well as an involved community.

Internex Online was the first home of iComm, a community initiative providing internet services to charitable and non-profit organizations.

External links

 A Brief history of Internex Online by one of its founders
 Greenlight Communications Inc. Acquires Internex On Line Inc. 
 Greenlight Communications to Support ACC Telenterprises in Providing Internet Services to Ontario Colleges 
 Greenlight Communications Inc. Sells Internet Canada Corporation to ACC TelEnterprises Ltd.
Internex telnet login screen

Internet service providers of Canada
Companies disestablished in 1995